Debonairs Pizza is a South African based pizza restaurant chain franchise founded in 1991 by Craig MacKenzie and Andrew Harvey.  MacKenzie came up with the idea and business model to found the company following a gap-year trip to Los Angeles when he was a student at the University of KwaZulu-Natal.  The first restaurants were established in Pietermaritzburg, followed by Umhlanga and then Durban.  The chain expanded rapidly and was acquired by Famous Brands in 1999.  The company has over 500 restaurants in 14 countries mostly located in Africa including Botswana, Dubai, Eswatini, Kenya, Lesotho, Malawi, Mauritius, Mozambique, Namibia, Nigeria, South Africa,  Ethiopia, Sudan, Zambia and Angola.  The majority of its 546 (2018) restaurants are located in South Africa, with 462 restaurants in the country. As of 2018, Debonairs Pizza was the largest pizza chain restaurant in South Africa.

See also 
 List of pizza chains
 List of pizza franchises
 List of pizza varieties by country

References 

Fast-food franchises
Pizza chains of South Africa
Pizza franchises
Restaurants established in 1991
Companies based in Johannesburg
1991 establishments in South Africa
Fast-food chains of South Africa